Pulsano Abbey, is a Catholic sanctuary on Mount Gargano, Italy, part of the commune of Monte Sant'Angelo, in the province of Foggia.

History
The historic site and its environs are protected by the Parco Nazionale del Gargano.

See also
 Monte Sant'Angelo

Notes

External links 
Sito ufficiale
Scheda Abbazia Pulsano su Sito istituzionela Città di Monte Sant'Angelo
Garganonline

Roman Catholic shrines
Buildings and structures in the Province of Foggia
Churches in the province of Foggia
Tourist attractions in Apulia